Goodenia maideniana is a species of flowering plant in the family Goodeniaceae and is endemic to inland areas of Western Australia and the Northern Territory. It is a prostrate or low-lying herb with toothed, egg-shaped leaves at the base of the plant, and racemes of yellow flowers.

Description

Taxonomy and naming
Goodenia maideniana was first formally described in 1904 William Vincent Fitzgerald in the Journal of the West Australian Natural History Society. The specific epithet (maideniana) honours the botanist Joseph Maiden.

Distribution and habitat
This goodenia grows near salt lakes on the southern edges of the Tanami, Gibson and Great Sandy Deserts, in Western Australia and the Northern Territory.

Conservation status
Goodenia maideniana is classified as "not threatened" by the Government of Western Australia Department of Parks and Wildlife and as of "least concern" under the Northern Territory Government Territory Parks and Wildlife Conservation Act 1976.

References

maideniana
Eudicots of Western Australia
Flora of the Northern Territory
Plants described in 1904
Taxa named by William Vincent Fitzgerald
Endemic flora of Australia